Calling from the Stars is the third solo studio album by French singer and DJ Miss Kittin.

Track listing

Personnel
Credits adapted from the liner notes of Calling from the Stars.

 Miss Kittin – vocals, production
 Pascal Gabriel – co-production on "Bassline" and "Eleven"
 Gesaffelstein – co-production on "Calling from the Stars"
 Mike Marsh – mastering
 Phrank – photos
 Toan Vu-Huu – artwork

Charts

Release history

References

2013 albums
Albums produced by Gesaffelstein
Albums produced by Pascal Gabriel
Miss Kittin albums